Aberdeen Street is a border street dividing Sheung Wan and Central on Hong Kong Island, Hong Kong. It ascends from Queen's Road Central to Caine Road in Mid-Levels. The street is named after George Hamilton-Gordon, 4th Earl of Aberdeen, Foreign Secretary at the time of the cession of Hong Kong Island to the United Kingdom in 1842.

History
In the early days after 1841, while Choong Wan was planned to be business centre of Victoria City and an area of Westener population, Chinese population was removed from Choong Wan to the area around Tai Ping Shan Street in Sheung Wan and Sheung Wan became the area of Chinese population.

South of Hollywood Road was the Alice Memorial Hospital and the College of Medicine where Sun Yat-sen graduated with distinction in 1892. After the college was merged into the University of Hong Kong, the hospital was also moved to Bonham Road and renamed to Nethersole Hospital.

After reclamation of island north, Aberdeen Street was extended in the north by Wing Kut Street, a pedestrian lane which hosts a street market.

Features
The following list follows a north–south order. (W) indicates the western side of the street, while (E) indicates the eastern side.
 Junction with Queen's Road Central
 This section is a ladder street
> intersection with Wellington Street
(E) Lin Heung Tea House
Located at 160–164 Wellington Street, at the corner with Aberdeen Street. The restaurant opened in 1928 and changed location several times before opening at its present location. It serves dim sum for breakfast and lunch and traditional Cantonese dishes for dinner.
(W)> junction with Kau U Fong
(W) Lan Kwai Fong Hotel
Located at No. 3 Kau U Fong, at the corner with Aberdeen Street. Despite the name, it is not located at Lan Kwai Fong.
(E)> junction with Wa on Lane
(W)> junction with Gough Street
(E)> junction with Gage Street
(E) Original site of the school where Yang Quyun was assassinated by Qing agents in 1911.
Located at No. 52 Gage Street, at the corner with Aberdeen Street. A marker, part of the Dr Sun Yat-sen Historical Trail is located in Aberdeen Street. The site is also included in the Central and Western Heritage Trail.
(E)> junction with Sam Ka Lane
> intersection with Hollywood Road
(W) PMQ
The compound occupies the block west of Aberdeen Street, between Hollywood Road and Staunton Street. It is located on the site of the former Central School. The school had been established in 1862 at Gough Street and moved to the Aberdeen Street location in 1889, while being renamed Victoria College. At that time, the school was one of the largest and most expensive buildings in Hong Kong. It was renamed Queen's College in 1894. The campus was destroyed during World War II, and the school was subsequently relocated. The buildings at Aberdeen Street were demolished in 1948 and the Quarters were opened in 1951. They were completely vacated in 2000. It has been revitalised as a creative hub for local design talents in 2014.
> intersection with Staunton Street
(E) Kwong Hon Terrace Garden
(W) Albron Court, at the corner with Caine Road
The current building occupies the site of a former two-storey-mansion of the same name, that had been built in the 1870s for H.N. Mody. A gatepost of the mansion remains in front of the building on Caine Road.
(E) St. Margaret's Girls' College, at the corner with Caine Road
> intersection with Caine Road

See also
List of streets and roads in Hong Kong

References

Further reading

External links

An article about the street in Sing Pao 
Google Maps of Aberdeen Street

Central, Hong Kong
Sheung Wan
Ladder streets in Hong Kong
Roads on Hong Kong Island